The 1996 Limerick Senior Hurling Championship was the 102nd staging of the Limerick Senior Hurling Championship since its establishment by the Limerick County Board.

Patrickswell were the defending champions.

On 3 November 1996, Patrickswell won the championship after a 1-12 to 0-06 defeat of Adare in a final replay. It was their 15th championship title overall and their second title in succession.

Results

Final

References

Limerick Senior Hurling Championship
Limerick Senior Hurling Championship